Thomas L. Copeland (born April 17, 1924) is an American former politician from Washington.

Copeland was born to Edwin and Delia Copeland in Pendleton, Oregon. He served in the United States Army during World War II, serving in Europe as a tank destroyer commander. After the conclusion of the war, he stayed with the Army as an administrator and was eventually promoted to captain. He is an alumnus of Washington State University, where he majored in agricultural engineering.

Copeland was elected to the Washington House of Representatives in 1957, for District 11, which encompassed the counties of Asotin, Columbia, Garfield and parts of Walla Walla. He is a Republican. He served until 1972; during his time he served stints as Whip (1961, 1963), Minority Leader (1965), and Speaker pro tempore (1967–1972). In 1972, he retired to run for the Washington State Senate, however he was unsuccessful in his election, later opting to retire from politics.

He was married to Dolly Doble, whom he met at college, until her death in 1970. They had three children. In 1973, he married Donna Edwards; the couple lives in Arizona.

References

1924 births
Republican Party members of the Washington House of Representatives
Living people
Politicians from Pendleton, Oregon
Washington State University alumni
United States Army personnel of World War II
Tank commanders
United States Army officers
Military personnel from Oregon